= 1946 Laotian Constituent Assembly election =

Constituent Assembly elections were held in Laos on 15 December 1946. The elections were held on a non-partisan basis, with all candidates running as independents.
